Augaptilidae is a family of copepods.

Genera

The family contains the following genera:

Alrhabdus Grice, 1973
Augaptilina G. O. Sars, 1920
Augaptilus Giesbrecht, 1889
Centraugaptilus G. O. Sars, 1920
Euaugaptilus G. O. Sars, 1920
Frankferrarius Markhaseva, 2013
Haloptilus Giesbrecht in Giesbrecht & Schmeil, 1898
Heteroptilus G. O. Sars, 1920
Pachyptilus G. O. Sars, 1920
Pontoptilus G. O. Sars, 1905
Pseudaugaptilus G. O. Sars, 1907
Pseudhaloptilus Wolfenden, 1911

References

Calanoida
Crustacean families